Sacha Horler (born 1971) is an Australian actress. Her parents were lawyers, but co-founded Sydney's Nimrod Theatre Company in the early 1970s.

Career
Sacha Horler graduated from Sydney's National Institute of Dramatic Arts in 1993 and made her film debut two years later with a role in the music-themed comedy Billy's Holiday. Among her Sydney stage credits were featured roles in the one-act play collection Playgrounds (1996) and Harold Pinter's theater classic The Birthday Party (1997). In 1997, Horler was featured in the Australian-produced drama Blackrock, and the following year she appeared in the international hit Babe: Pig in the City.

Horler's breakthrough role was in the 1998 gritty drama Praise which featured a significant amount of nudity and sex scenes. In 1999, her follow-up supporting role in Soft Fruit required her to gain weight for the part. That same year she had a supporting role  in the drama My Mother Frank.

Over the next ten years, Horler appeared in various roles in a number of Australian TV series. The more significant of these were the Australian Broadcasting Corporation comedy TV series Grass Roots in 2000 and 2003, the miniseries Changi in 2001, TV series drama CrashBurn and science fiction drama Farscape in 2003, and drama series headLand and the critically acclaimed Love My Way in 2006.

In 2009, Horler starred in the AFI-nominated Australian drama My Year Without Sex. Since then she has had recurring roles in a number of Australian drama series including Offspring in 2010, Small Time Gangster and legal drama Crownies in 2011, and the telemovie Beaconsfield in 2012.

Awards
Horler won two Australian Film Institute acting awards in 1999, winning Best Actress as a sexual obsessive in Praise, and Best Supporting Actress for her role in Soft Fruit. Horler also won Best Supporting Actress in 2003 for her role in Travelling Light.

Filmography
Billy's Holiday, 1995, Kristin
Blackrock, 1997, Teacher
Babe: Pig in the City, 1998, Night Nurse
Praise, 1998, Cynthia
Soft Fruit, 1999, Nadia
Walk the Talk, 2000, Bonita
My Mother Frank, 2000, Margaret
Grass Roots, 2000, Helen Mansoufis
Changi (TV series), 2001, Nerida
Russian Doll, 2001, Liza
Halifax f.p: Takes Two, 2002, Karen Oldfield
Syntax Error, 2003, Lauren
Travelling Light, 2003, Bronwyn White
CrashBurn, 2003, Abby
Love My Way, 2004,
Go Big, 2004, Michaela Twinch
BlackJack: Ace Point Game, 2005, Angie
The Illustrated Family Doctor, 2005, Carol Kelp
Look Both Ways, 2005, Linda
My Year Without Sex, 2009, Natalie
Hawke, 2010, Jean Sinclair
Legend of the Guardians: The Owls of Ga'Hoole, 2010, Strix Struma
Offspring, 2010 – present, Stacey
Crownies, 2011, Virginia
Kings Cross ER: St Vincent's Hospital, 2012 – present, narrator
The Dressmaker, 2015 - Una Pleasance
Peter Rabbit 2018 - Taxi driver

TV appearances
 Water Rats ... Christine Martin – in the episode "Bad Blood" (1996)
 Murder Call ... Elspeth – in the episode "More Than Meets the Eye" (1998)
 Grass Roots (2000)
 Farscape ... Morrock – in the episode "Prayer" (2003)
 Crashburn ... Abby (2003)
Rake ... Annie Murray - in the episode "R vs Murray" (2010)
 Old School ... Rhonda (2014)
 Black Comedy ... various roles (2014)         
 Catching Milat (TV series) ... Karen Milat (2015) 
The Letdown (2017-2019)
 Home and Away ... Ranae Turner
 Sando ... Sando (2018)
 Secret Bridesmaids' Business, 2019, Lucy Dean

External links
 

Living people
Australian film actresses
Australian television actresses
Actresses from Sydney
National Institute of Dramatic Art alumni
Best Actress AACTA Award winners
Best Supporting Actress AACTA Award winners
1971 births
20th-century Australian actresses
21st-century Australian actresses